Charles Bernard Major (born December 31, 1954) is a Canadian country music artist. He has recorded seven studio albums and released more than twenty singles. In 2019 he was inducted into the Canadian Country Music Hall of Fame.

Musical career
Born in Aylmer, Quebec, Charlie Major knew he wanted to be a musician since he was 19 years old. He was blinded in one eye as a result of a pellet gun accident when he was 12. He spent 15 years traveling as far as Spain writing songs and putting country bands together, which eventually led to a record deal with Arista Records. Major released his debut album in Canada, The Other Side, in 1993. All six singles released from the album went to No. 1 on the RPM Country chart.

He won the Juno Award as Country Male Vocalist of the Year two years in a row (Juno Awards in 1994 and 1995). Five major Canadian Country Music Awards followed, along with songwriting honours from SOCAN, and a BMI Award in 1993 for "Backroads", recorded by Ricky Van Shelton in 1991 on his Backroads album, as the "Most Performed Song in America." In 2006 he made an appearance on the television show "Holmes on Homes."

Personal life
Charlie Major is divorced and is the father of three sons.  He divides his time between homes in Ottawa, Ontario; and in Nashville, Tennessee, where he first moved in 1994.  Today Major spends the majority of his time in his native Canada.

Discography

Awards and nominations

References

External links 
Official web site
Official MySpace page
Music Videos
Charlie Major: Tough Music That's Headed Straight for Your Heart
 

1954 births
Living people
Musicians from Gatineau
Writers from Gatineau
Canadian country singer-songwriters
Canadian male singer-songwriters
Juno Award winners
Arista Nashville artists
Imprint Records artists
Canadian Country Music Association Male Artist of the Year winners
Canadian Country Music Association Single of the Year winners
Canadian Country Music Association Song of the Year winners
Canadian Country Music Association Album of the Year winners